Bogovići is a village in the Primorje-Gorski Kotar County, Croatia. Administratively it belongs to the municipality of Malinska-Dubašnica. In 2011, its population was of 317 people.

References 

Populated places in Primorje-Gorski Kotar County